Jostedal is a former municipality in the old Sogn og Fjordane county in Norway.  The  municipality existed from 1838 until its dissolution in 1963.  It was located in the Jostedalen valley in the northern part of the present-day municipality of Luster, in Vestland county, north of the village of Gaupne. The administrative centre was also located near the Jostedal Church in the central part of the valley.

Name
The Old Norse form of the name was probably . The first element is then the genitive of Jastra (the old name of the river Jostedøla) and the last element is dalr which means "valley" or "dale". The river name is probably derived from jǫstr which means "yeast". The water in the river comes from glaciers, and in summer time the river gets "frothy" or "foamy" due to all of the melting ice and the many waterfalls.

History
Jostedal was established as a municipality on 1 January 1838 (see formannskapsdistrikt law). During the 1960s, there were many municipal mergers across Norway due to the work of the Schei Committee. On 1 January 1963, Jostedal municipality (population: 796) was merged with the neighboring municipalities of Luster (population: 2,674) and Hafslo (population: 2,384) which created a newer, larger Luster Municipality.

Geography
The former municipality consisted of Jostedalen valley which empties into the Gaupnefjord at the village of Gaupne. The Gaupnefjord is an arm of the Lustrafjorden, which is an arm of the famous Sognefjord, the second largest fjord in the world. There are three major glacial lakes in the area: Tunsbergdalsvatn, Nigardsbrevatn, and Styggevatn (vatn is Norwegian for lake). Other lakes in Jostdedal include Austdalsvatnet and Styggevatnet.

Jostedalsbreen National Park and Breheimen National Park are located on either side of the Jostedalen valley.

Government

Municipal council
The municipal council  of Jostedal was made up of 13 representatives that were elected to four year terms.  The party breakdown of the final municipal council was as follows:

Notable residents
Kåre Øvregard (born 1933) - politician
Kristen Øyen (born 1938) - forester

See also
List of former municipalities of Norway

References

External links

http://www.jostedal.com/ 

Luster, Norway
Former municipalities of Norway
1838 establishments in Norway
1963 disestablishments in Norway